Eduardo Francisco Pironio (3 December 1920 – 5 February 1998) was an Argentine Roman Catholic cardinal who served in numerous departments of the Roman Curia from 1975 to 1996. He was named Cardinal-Bishop of Sabina-Poggio in 1995.

On 30 June 2006, the Diocese of Rome began requesting testimonies about the life and sanctity of Cardinal Pironio which opened his cause of canonization and bestowed upon him the posthumous title Servant of God. Pope Francis named him as Venerable on 18 February 2022.

Life

Early life and education
Eduardo Pironio was born on 3 December 1920 in Argentina as the last of 22 children of José Pironio and Enriqueta Rosa Butazzoni, who had emigrated from Friuli, Italy.

Months before his death, in an interview, he stated that: "I am the twenty-second child, the last born, and I have to recognize that the story is somewhat miraculous. ...When their first son was born, my mother was only 18 years old, and she became gravely ill. She was in bed for six months, unable to move. When she recovered, the doctors told her that she would not be able to have more children, and that if she did, her life would be in grave danger. She later gave birth to 21 more children – I am the last – and she lived to the age of 82."

Pironio attended elementary school prior to moving into the seminary in La Plata where he studied both philosophy and theology. He continued his studies at the Pontifical Angelicum Athenaeum in Rome where he attained a licentiate in theology.

Church career
He was ordained on 5 December 1943 in Argentina by Anunciado Serafini. He served as a staff member of the Pío XII Seminary in Mercedes from 1944 until 1959. Pironio served as the vicar general of the Diocese of Mercedes from 1959 until a year later, and he went on to serve as the rector of the Metropolitan Seminary of Villa Devoto from 1960 to 1964. He attended the Second Vatican Council from 1962 to 1964 as an expert.

On 24 March 1964 Pope Paul VI appointed him auxiliary bishop of La Plata and titular bishop of Caeciri. He received his episcopal consecration on 31 May 1964 from Antonio José Plaza. He attended the later sessions of the Second Vatican Council in 1964 and 1965 as a bishop, no longer as an expert. In 1967, he was named to serve briefly as apostolic administrator of the Avellaneda.

Pironio served as the Secretary-General of the Latin American Episcopal Council from 1967 to 1972. He also attended the Synod of Bishops from 29 September to 29 October 1967, and later attended the Second General Conference of the Latin American Episcopate from 24 August to 6 September 1968 in Colombia. He attended two additional synods in 1969 and in 1971. Pironio was elected as the President of the Latin American Episcopal Conference in 1972, served until 1974, and was confirmed for an extra year.

He was named the Bishop of Mar del Plata on 19 April 1972. He preached the spiritual exercises for Pope Paul VI and the Roman Curia for Lent in 1974. On 20 September 1975 he was named Pro-Prefect of the Congregation for Institutes of Consecrated Life and Societies of Apostolic Life and made Titular Archbishop of Thiges. He became Prefect of that Congregation when he became a cardinal and held that office until 1984. Pironio also attended the synod of 1974 as a relator and as a member of its general secretariat.

Paul VI, on 24 May 1976, made him Cardinal-Deacon of Santi Cosma e Damiano. As a cardinal he participated in the synod of 1977, and served as a cardinal elector in the papal conclaves of August and October 1978 that elected Pope John Paul I and Pope John Paul II respectively. He was thought to be a possible candidate for election as pope in that year. In 1979, he attended the Third General Conference of the Latin American Episcopate in Mexico, and later a synod in 1980 and 1983.

On 8 April 1984 Pope John Paul II named him President of the Pontifical Council for the Laity. In that position, together with John Paul II, Pironio was a promoter of the first World Youth Day. He served at seven additional synods during the next decade. As is traditional after ten years of serving as Cardinal-Deacon, he took the option of becoming Cardinal-Priest while retaining his titular church. On 11 July 1995 John Paul named him Cardinal-Bishop of the suburbicarian see of Sabina-Poggio Mirteto.

He retired in 1996. Pironio attended the Fourth General Conference of the Latin American Episcopal Conference in 1992 in the Dominican Republic and was appointed papal envoy to the 5th National Marian Congress in Ecuador in 1992.

Death
Pironio died in 1998 of bone cancer in Rome. John Paul II presided over the funeral rites with 27 cardinals also in attendance. His remains were taken to Buenos Aires and after a Mass presided over by Cardinal Antonio Quarracino, his remains were buried in the left lateral altar of the Basilica of Our Lady of Luján.

Process of canonisation
The approval to commence the cause was granted on 24 March 2006 – which granted him the posthumous title Servant of God – and commenced in Rome on 23 June 2006. On 28 June 2006 Cardinal Camillo Ruini, Vicar for the Diocese of Rome, stated in an edict that "with the passing of years, his fame for sanctity has increased, and therefore it has been formally requested that we begin his cause of beatification and canonization".

The Archdiocesan Tribunal of Buenos Aires initiated the Argentine phase of the beatification process on 22 February 2007 and it heard the testimonies of approximately thirty-three witnesses, bishops, priests, religious men and women, and lay people. The diocesan process shall conclude its work in Rome on 11 March 2016; this will result in all documentation being submitted to the Congregation for the Causes of Saints who will commence the "Roman Phase" of the cause.

Pope Francis named Pironio as Venerable after confirming that the late cardinal lived a life of heroic virtue on 18 February 2022.

The postulator assigned was the Benedictine Giuseppe Tamburrino while the vice-postulator appointed was Professor Beatriz Buzzetti.

The miracle required for beatification was brought to the attention of officials of the cause and the formal diocesan process for the investigation of the miracle commenced in 2008; it concluded in August 2014.

References

Additional sources

External links
Catholic Hierarchy 

1920 births
1998 deaths
20th-century Roman Catholic bishops in Argentina
Argentine cardinals
Cardinal-bishops of Sabina
20th-century Roman Catholic titular archbishops
Argentine people of Italian descent
Participants in the Second Vatican Council
20th-century venerated Christians
Members of the Congregation for Institutes of Consecrated Life and Societies of Apostolic Life
Pontifical Council for the Laity
Cardinals created by Pope Paul VI
Roman Catholic bishops of Mar del Plata
Roman Catholic bishops of La Plata in Argentina
Venerated Catholics by Pope Francis
Bishops appointed by Pope Paul VI